The Elfstedenronde is a one-day road cycling race held annually in Belgium. It was held originally from 1943 until 1989, and returned in 2017 as the Bruges Cycling Classic. The race has also been called the Tour des Onze Villes and the Circuit des Onze Villes. It is part of UCI Europe Tour in category 1.1.

Winners

References

Cycle races in Belgium
UCI Europe Tour races
Recurring sporting events established in 1943
1943 establishments in Belgium